Hem Ljuva Hem Trädgård (meaning Home Sweet Home Garden in English) is a magazine published in Sweden. The first issue of the magazine was published in April 2002. Its sister magazine is Hem Ljuva Hem. Both magazines are part of Plaza Publishing Group. The magazine covers articles about gardening and related topics. It is published four times a year. The headquarters is in Stockholm.

References

2002 establishments in Sweden
Hobby magazines
Gardening magazines
Magazines established in 2002
Magazines published in Stockholm
Quarterly magazines published in Sweden
Swedish-language magazines